The Piano Concerto No. 1 in D major, Op. 17, by Camille Saint-Saëns was composed in 1858, when the composer was 23 and dedicated to Marie Jaëll. It is the first piano concerto ever written by a major French composer.

Movements 
There are three movements:

Instrumentation  
The work is scored for solo piano, 2 flutes, 2 oboes, 2 clarinets, 2 bassoons, 4 horns, 2 trumpets, timpani and strings. A notable feature is an opening triadic solo for the natural horn which predates the much more famous example of Johannes Brahms's B-flat Concerto by around 20 years.

Recordings 

 Jeanne-Marie Darré, piano, Orchestre National de la Radiodiffusion Française, conducted by Louis Fourestier. 2 CD EMI 1955 1957 report 1996
 Aldo Ciccolini, piano, Orchestre de Paris, conducted by Serge Baudo. 2 CD Emi 1971. Choc de Classica 2019
 Philippe Entremont, piano, Orchestre du Capitole de Toulouse, conducted by Michel Plasson, 2 CD CBS Sony 1976
 Jean-Philippe Collard, piano, Royal Philharmonic Orchestra, conducted by André Previn (2 CD EMI classics 1987).
 Pascal Rogé, piano, Philharmonia Orchestra, conducted by Charles Dutoit. 2 CD Decca 1981
 Stephen Hough, piano, City of Birmingham Symphony Orchestra, conducted by Sakari Oramo. 2 CD Hyperion 2001. Gramophone Awards record of the year 2002. Diapason d'or, Choc Le Monde la Musique
 Anna Malikova, piano, Orchestre Symphonique de la WDR de Cologne, conducted by Thomas Sanderling. 2 SACD Audite 2010

External links 

Piano concerto 1
1858 compositions
Compositions in D major